Los Angeles Forum for Architecture and Urban Design (founded in 1987) is a non-profit organization dedicated to supporting innovative art, architecture, design, and urbanism that takes the city as a laboratory. The Forum plays a vital role among architecture organizations nationally and internationally by initiating, presenting, and debating architectural and urbanistic speculations about Los Angeles.

Programs
LA Forum programming includes publications, lectures, competitions, and exhibitions. Featured lecture series include the Out There Doing It series that features emerging voices in the design field, and the On the Map series which stages presentations by architects in spaces of their design. The LA Forum also presents a local version of Pecha Kucha night developed in Tokyo by Klein Dytham Architects.

The LA Forum has a rich history of publications. Currently in production is a series of LA Forum Pamphlets

Pamphlets
 Dead Malls, ed. Warren Techentin
 Out The Window: LAX, by Zoe Crosher with essays by Norman Klein, Pico Iyer, and Julian Myers
 Polar Inertia, by Ted Kane with essay by Greg Goldin
 "After the city, this", story and photographs by Tom Marble design by Juliette Bellocq

ForumFest
The LA Forum annual fundraiser is an event that draws together the Los Angeles area architectural community in a social event. Proceeds support LA Forum programming. Each event has honored an influential figure in Los Angeles design culture.

Past honorees
 Merry Norris
 Aaron Betsky
 Craig Hodgetts and Ming Fing
 Thom Mayne
 Hank Koning and Julie Eizenberg of Koning Eizenberg Architecture, Inc.

Organization

The LA Forum is led by an all volunteer board which develops all programming and publications. Founded in 1987 the Forum has provided a platform for emerging voices and a compelling forum for architectural discourse.

Past presidents
1988-1990 Christian Hubert
1990-1992 Aaron Betsky
1992-1993 Michael Saee
1993-1996 Ming Fung
1996-1998 John Dutton
1998-2000 Joe Day
2000-2002 Ric Corsini
2002-2004 Frank Escher
2004-2006 Kazys Varnelis
2006-2007 Warren Techentin
2007-2008 Michael Pinto
2008- 2009 Mohamed Sharif
2010 - 2011 Jason Kerwin
2012 - 2013 Thurman Grant
2014 - 2015 Ella Hazard & Mimi Zeiger
2016 - 2018 Roberto Sheinberg
2018 - 2019 Geoffrey von Oeyen
2019 - 2020 Katrin Terstegen
2020 - 2021 Wendy Gilmartin
2021 - 2022 Nina Briggs

References

External links
Official site

Culture of Los Angeles
Non-profit organizations based in Los Angeles
Architectural design
1987 establishments in California